The One Per Desk, or OPD, was an innovative hybrid personal computer/telecommunications terminal based on the hardware of the Sinclair QL. The One Per Desk was built by International Computers Limited (ICL) and launched in the UK in 1984. It was the result of a collaborative project between ICL, Sinclair Research and British Telecom begun in 1983, originally intended to incorporate Sinclair's flat-screen CRT technology.

Rebadged versions of the OPD were sold in the United Kingdom as the Merlin Tonto and as the Computerphone by Telecom Australia and the New Zealand Post Office. The initial orders placed for the One Per Desk were worth £4.5 million (for 1500 units) from British Telecom and £8 million from Telecom Australia, with ICL focusing on telecommunications providers as the means to reach small- and medium-sized businesses.

Hardware 

From the QL, the OPD borrowed the 68008 CPU, ZX8301/8302 ULAs, 128 KB of RAM and dual Microdrives (re-engineered by ICL for greater reliability) but not the 8049 Intelligent Peripheral Controller.  Unique to the OPD was a "telephony module" incorporating an Intel 8051 microcontroller (which also controlled the keyboard), two PSTN lines and a V.21/V.23 modem, plus a built-in telephone handset and a TI TMS5220 speech synthesiser (for automatic answering of incoming calls).

The OPD was supplied with either a 9-inch monochrome (white) monitor, priced at £1,195 plus VAT, or with a 14-inch colour monitor, priced at £1,625 plus VAT. Both monitors also housed the power supply for the OPD itself.

Later, 3.5" floppy disk drives were also available from third-party vendors.

Software 

The system firmware (BFS or "Basic Functional Software") was unrelated to the QL's Qdos operating system, although a subset of SuperBASIC was provided on Microdrive cartridge. The BFS provided application-switching, voice/data call management, call answering, phone number directories, viewdata terminal emulation and a simple calculator.

The Psion applications suite bundled with the QL was also ported to the OPD as Xchange and was available as an optional ROM pack, priced at £130.

Other optional application software available on ROM included various terminal emulators such as Satellite Computing's ICL7561 emulator, plus their Action Diary and Presentation Software, address book, and inter-OPD communications utilities.

An ICL supplied application was used to synchronise a national bingo game across hundreds of bingo halls in the UK. The integral V.23 dialup modem was used to provide remote communications to the central server.

Several UK ICL Mainframe (Series 39) customers, in Local Government and Ministry of Defence sectors, used statistics applications on OPD systems to view graphical representations of mainframe reports. Once again, the integral V.23 modem was used to download from the mainframe.

Merlin Tonto 

British Telecom Business Systems sold the OPD as the Merlin M1800 Tonto. BT intended the Tonto to be a centralised desktop information system able to access online services, mainframes and other similar systems through the BT telephone network. The Tonto retailed at £1,500 at launch. OPD peripherals and software ROM cartridges were also badged under the Merlin brand. BT withdrew support for the Tonto in February 1993.
The name Tonto was derived from "The Outstanding New Telecoms Opportunity"

A data communications adapter was introduced for the Tonto as a plug-in option or fitted on new units, providing a standard RS423 interface for use with mainframe computers or data communications networks, permitting the use of the Tonto as a VT100 terminal. A separate VT Link product provided support for VT52 and VT100 emulation for mainframe access over dial-up connections.

Work on the Tonto influenced the design of a follow-on product by BT's Communications Terminal Products Group and Rathdown Industries known as the QWERTYphone, this aiming to provide the telephony features of the Tonto at "a much lower cost and in a more user-friendly manner".

ComputerPhone 

Aimed at the "office automation" market and seeking to integrate computing and telecommunications technology, combining support for both voice and data, the One Per Desk product was perceived as the first of its kind designed to meet the needs of managers, who would be relying on old-fashioned paper-based practices to perform their "complex and heavy workloads" involving a variety of ongoing activities including meetings, telephone calls, research, administration and numerous other tasks. Such potential users of information technology had apparently been ignored by office automation efforts, and personal computers were perceived as "exceeding most managers' requirements". The ComputerPhone attempted to sit between more specialised telephony devices and more advanced workstations, being marketed as an "executive" workstation in Australia, somewhat more towards middle management in New Zealand. Advertisements emphasised the telephony, office suite, desktop calculator, videotex, terminal and electronic messaging capabilities.

MegaOPD 

An enhanced version of the OPD was produced in small numbers for the United States market. This had a 68008FN CPU, 256 KB of RAM as standard, an RS-232 port and enhanced firmware.
The telephone answering function had a female voice, with a slight New Jersey accent.

Legacy 

ICL were the preferred supplier for UK local government, and OPDs found their way onto desks of council officers. Due to the cost, they tended to be issued only to the most senior, who were often elderly, had no interest in computers, and had secretaries to handle their administrative work, so many devices were simply used as telephones.

References

External links 
 
 Description of Merlin Tonto from BT Engineering
 ICL One Per Desk page at rwapsoftware.co.uk including a floppy disk project

Computer-related introductions in 1984
Personal computers
Sinclair Research
ICL workstations
BT Group
68k-based computers